Il dottor Antonio is a 1949 opera by Franco Alfano to a libretto by Mario Ghisalberti  based on the 1855 nationalist novel by the Italian writer Giovanni Ruffini.

Recording
Giacinto Prandelli (Dottor Antonio), Carla Gavazzi (Lucy), Angela Vercelli (Speranza), Ortensia Beggiato (Madre di Speranza), Mario Boriello (Rey de Napoles); conducted by Alfredo Simonetto 1953

References

Operas
1949 operas
Operas by Franco Alfano
Italian-language operas